Thesaurica accensalis is a moth in the family Crambidae. It was described by Charles Swinhoe in 1903. It is found in Thailand.

The forewings are pale yellow with bright orange-red bands. The hindwings are white with a slight red tinge on the outer border.

References

Moths described in 1903
Odontiinae